Tarbell Brook is a  stream located in southwestern New Hampshire and northern Massachusetts in the United States.  It is a tributary of the Millers River, itself a tributary of the Connecticut River, which flows to Long Island Sound.

Tarbell Brook rises in the western part of Rindge, New Hampshire, at the outlet of Pearly Lake, and flows south to the Damon Reservoirs.

History
It bears the name of Lieutenant Samuel Tarbell (1744-1828), a Revolutionary War Minuteman who settled in Rindge with his wife Beatrice Carter in 1773, soon thereafter building a watermill at the outflow of Pearly Lake (formerly known as Tarbell Pond). Although the mill is long gone, Tarbell's Cape Cod style house nearby still presides over Route 119.

See also

List of rivers of Massachusetts
List of rivers of New Hampshire

References

Rivers of New Hampshire
Rivers of Worcester County, Massachusetts
Tributaries of the Connecticut River
Rivers of Massachusetts
Rivers of Cheshire County, New Hampshire